Josh Andrews (born June 21, 1991) is an American football offensive guard who is a free agent. He played college football at Oregon State. He has also been a member of the Philadelphia Eagles, Minnesota Vikings, Indianapolis Colts, and New York Jets.

College career
Andrews played for the Oregon State Beavers, where he had 32 career starts at left guard. He played high school football at Colony High School in Ontario, California.

Professional career

Philadelphia Eagles
Andrews was signed by the Philadelphia Eagles in 2014 as an undrafted free agent. He was cut by the Eagles on August 30, 2014, and then signed to the practice squad on August 31, 2014.

On September 2, 2017, Andrews was waived by the Eagles and was signed to the practice squad the next day. Andrews remained on the Philadelphia practice squad through the 2017 season, which ended with the Eagles defeating the New England Patriots in Super Bowl LII.

Minnesota Vikings
On February 12, 2018, Andrews signed with the Minnesota Vikings. He was waived/injured on September 1, 2018, and was placed on injured reserve. He was released on September 7, 2018.

Philadelphia Eagles (second stint)
On September 25, 2018, the Philadelphia Eagles signed Andrews to their practice squad.

Indianapolis Colts
On November 20, 2018, Andrews was signed by the Indianapolis Colts off the Eagles practice squad.

New York Jets
On April 2, 2020, Andrews signed with the New York Jets. He was released during final roster cuts on September 5, 2020, but was re-signed two days later. On December 30, 2020, Andrews was placed on injured reserve. He started four games in 2020, his first starts of his career, including his last three at right guard.

Atlanta Falcons
On April 1, 2021, Andrews signed a one-year contract with the Atlanta Falcons. He suffered a broken hand in practice and was placed on injured reserve on September 1, 2021. He was activated on October 18.

New Orleans Saints
On May 18, 2022, Andrews signed with the New Orleans Saints. He was released on August 30, 2022 and signed to the practice squad the next day. He was promoted to the active roster on November 12. He was waived on December 12 and re-signed to the practice squad.

Personal life
Andrews is the son of Nate and Tanya Smith, he has two brothers, Darrell and Devin. He graduated from Oregon State University in December 2013 with a degree in sociology.

In 2020, Andrews stated in an interview that he has Narcolepsy, a neurological sleep disorder. For the NFL’s 2020-2021 My Cause My Cleats initiative, Andrews chose Project Sleep as his organization to support.

References

External links
Philadelphia Eagles Player bio

1991 births
Living people
Players of American football from Los Angeles
Oregon State Beavers football players
Atlanta Falcons players
Philadelphia Eagles players
Minnesota Vikings players
Indianapolis Colts players
New York Jets players
New Orleans Saints players